Kalanath Mishra (born 19 December 1959) is a Hindi author. His writing spans several genres of Hindi literature, including kavita (poetry), kahani (story), laghukatha (novelettes), samiksha (reviews), and reports.

Biography

Mishra completed his M.A. in Hindi from Patna University. He later received his MBA from L. N. Mishra Institute of Economic Development & Social Change (Patna). He started his career with the Patliputra Times, a daily Hindi newspaper of Bihar.  He has been awarded degree of  Ph.D. from Patna University, Patna, on the topic : (Sahityakaron ke Jivan par adhrit Hindi Upanyason me jivani ke tatwa evam aupanyasik Kalpana). In 1990, Mishra left his job, and joined as a lecturer of Hindi at Magadh University.

Currently, Mishra is pursuing his writing along with his job. He is working in the field of education, culture, literature and journalism.  His articles are being published in various literary magazines.

व्यक्तित्व एवं कृतित्व -:

    डॉ.कलानाथ मिश्र एक बहुमुखी प्रतिभा के धनी साहित्यकार हैं। इन्होंने हिंदी साहित्य की कई विधाओं यथा-कहानी, कविता, जीवनी, लेख, व्यंग्य आदि पर अपनी लेखनी चलाई। अपनी अनूठी अभिव्यक्ति शैली एवं सूक्ष्म चिंतनदृष्टि के कारण हिंदी के आध्ुनिक साहित्यकारों में इनका प्रमुख स्थान है। कलानाथ मिश्र की रचनाएँ हमें कई रंगों एवं रूपों में देखने को मिलती हैं। इनके वैचारिक एवं साहित्यिक लेख, कविताएँ, कहानियाँ आरंभ से ही देश के प्रसि( पत्रा-पत्रिकाओं में प्रकाशित होती रही हैं। इनका जन्म 19 दिसम्बर, 1959 ई. में बिहार के पटना में हुआ था। डाॅ. मिश्र आठवे कक्षा तक की अपनी पढ़ाई चाॅदचैर मथुरापुर स्कूल से की। यहाँ वे अपने दादा पं. कपिलेश्वर मिश्र (जो विश्वभारती शांति निकेतन में गुरुदेव रविन्द्र नाथ ठाकुर के साथ व्याकरण के प्रोफेसर थे) के सानिध्य में रहकर स्कूली शिक्षा प्राप्त किया। पं. कपिलेश्वर मिश्र के ज्ञान गुण तथा उनके सांस्कृतिक व्यक्तित्व का प्रभाव बालक कलानाथ मिश्र पर अमिट हो गया। यही समय था जब डाॅ. मिश्र में समाज, संस्कृति और साहित्य के प्रति रूझान हुआ। बाद में पटना काॅलेजिएट स्कूल और पटना विश्वविद्यालय से उच्च शिक्षा ग्रहण की। इनकी शिक्षा-दीक्षा भी यही हुई। पटना में वे अपने पिता स्व. पं. गणानाथ मिश्र एवं चाचा श्री भवनाथ मिश्र के साथ रहकर पटना विश्वविद्यालय से हिंदी में स्नातकोत्तर की पढाई की। पिता गणनाथ मिश्र प्रख्यात अजंता प्रेस जहाँ से प्रसिद्ध पत्रिका अवंतिका प्रकाशित होती थी के प्रबंध निदेशक थे एवं बाद में नोवेल्टी कलर प्रिंटिंग प्रेस स्थापित किया। यही कारण था कि पुस्तक, पत्र-पत्रिका, मुद्रण कार्य से डा. मिश्र का जुड़ाव हुआ। पटना में प्रख्यात समाज सेवी एवं साहित्य सेवी स्व. जयनाथ मिश्र के साथ रह,े जहाँ साहित्यकारों का तांता लगा रहता था। अवंतिका के संपादक लक्ष्मी नारायाण सुधांशु, रामधारी सिंह दिनकर, प्रफुल्ल चंद्र ओझा मुक्त, छविनाथ पांडेय, आरसी प्रसाद सिंह, जनार्दन प्रसाद झा द्विज, गोवर्धन प्रसाद सदय, हरिमोहन झा, मदनमोहन पाण्डेय सरीखे विद्वानों की मंडली लगती थी। इस परिवेश का प्रभाव कलानाथ मिश्र जी के व्यक्तित्व पर पड़ा। एम.ए. करने के बाद मिश्र जी ने ललित नारायण मिश्र आर्थिक विकास एवं सामाजिक परिवर्तन संस्थान, पटना से व्यावसायिक प्रबंधन में स्नातकोत्तर (एम.बी.ए.) किया। इन्होंने ‘साहित्यकारों के जीवन पर आध्ृत हिंदी उपन्यासों में जीवनी के तत्व और औपन्यासिक कल्पना’ विषय पर पटना विश्वविद्यालय से पी-एच.डी. तथा ‘स्वातंत्रयोत्तर हिंदी उपन्यास-अवधरणा और सृजन प्रक्रिया’ विषय पर राँची विश्वविद्यालय से डी. लिट. की उपाध् िप्राप्त की तथा संप्रति ए. एन. काॅलेज, पटना में हिंदी विभागाध्यक्ष के रूप में कार्यरत हैं। मिश्रजी कई साहित्यिक गतिविध्यिों एवं संस्थानों से भी जुडे़ हैं। कवि सम्मेलनों एवं साहित्यिक गोष्ठियों में भी इनकी सक्रिय उपस्थिति एवं महत्वपूर्ण भूमिका होती है। पत्राकारिता के क्षेत्रा में भी इनकी अहम भूमिका रही है। इन्होंने पत्राकारिता की शुरुआत बिहार के प्रसि( दैनिकपत्रा ‘पाटलीपुत्रा टाइम्स’ से की थी। कालांतर में ‘राष्ट्रीय प्रसंग’ मासिक पत्रिका के नियमित स्तंभकार भी रहे एवं ‘अनुपम उपहार’ मासिक पत्रिका में सलाहकार संपादक की भूमिका निभाई। वर्तमान में इनके संपादन में ‘साहित्य यात्रा’ नामक त्रौमासिक सांस्कृतिक एवं साहित्यिक शोध् पत्रिका का प्रकाशन हो रहा है। 

     कलानाथ मिश्र हिन्दी साहित्य के लोकप्रिय लेखकों मे से एक है। उन्होंने कविता, कहानी, उपन्यास, समीक्षा और रिपोर्ट सभी विधाओं में कलम की कारीगरी की है। उनके उत्कृष्ट कौशल के आधार पर हिंदी साहित्य की सुर्खियों में उनका नाम है। बिहार में 19 दिसंबर, 1959 को जन्मे कलानाथ मिश्र ने बहुत शुरुआती दिनों से ही लिखना शुरू किया। पटना विश्वविद्यालय से हिन्दी में एम.ए. करने के उपरान्त उन्होंने एल.एन. मिश्रसे आर्थिक विकास और सामाजिक परिवर्तन संस्थान से एम.बीए भी किया।, कलानाथ मिश्रा ने पटना विश्वविद्यालय से डॉक्टरेट की डिग्री प्राप्त की। ‘‘साहित्यकारों के जीवन पर आधृत हिन्दी उपन्यासों में जीवनी के तत्व और औपन्यासिक कल्पना’’ विषय पर पटना विष्वविद्यालय से पी-एच0 डी0 की उपाघि प्राप्त की। 
   डाॅ. मिश्र ने प्रसिद्ध हिन्दी दैनिक पाटलिपुत्र टाइम्स, से अपने कैरियर की शुरूआत की। बाद में, मगध विश्वविद्यालय में हिंदी के प्राध्यापक के रूप में नौकरी आरंभ की। आज शिक्षा, संस्कृति, साहित्य और पत्रकारिता के क्षेत्र में उनकी अच्छी पहचान है। कलानाथ मिश्र एक बहुमुखी प्रतिभा संपन्न व्यक्ति हैं। लेखन के साथ साथ एक विशिष्ट वक्ता और उद्घोषक के रूप् में भी उनकी पहचान है। उनके लेख विभिन्न साहित्यिक पत्र पत्रिकाओं में प्रकाशित होते रहे है। 
  डॉ.मिश्र हिन्दी के साथ साथ मैथिली भाषा में भी अपनी पहचान बनाई है। उनकी प्रमुख पुस्तकों में "हिन्दी उपन्यास में साहित्यकारों का चरित्र विधान", "हिन्दी उपन्यास में संस्कृत रचनाकारों का जीवनवृत्त", जीवन छन्द, कविता संग्रह, मेरे समकालीन बिहार के विभूतिए ‘दो कमरे का मन’(कहानी संग्रह), समकालीन मैथिली कथा साहित्य, याद रखना इस पथिक को, जीवनी, आवारा मसीहा की औपन्यासिकता, आधुनिक मैथिली साहित्य एवं नारी विमर्श, साहित्यः विविध परिप्रेक्ष्य आदि प्रमुख हैं।
 डॉ.मिश्र को उनके उत्कृष्ट साहित्य सेवा हेतु नईधारा विशिष्ट रचनाकार सम्मान से सम्मानित किया गया। साहित्यकार सांसद, द्वारा आचार्य रामचन्द्र शुक्ल सम्मान तथा छठवाँ अंतरराष्ट्रीय हिन्दी सम्मेलन एवम दुबई में उन्हें  साहित्य सृजन सम्मान से भी सम्माानित किया जा चुका है।
 

रचनाएँ

कलानाथ मिश्र की रचनाएँ हमें कई रंगों एवं रूपों में देखने को मिलती हैं। इनके वैचारिक एवं साहित्यिक लेख, कविताएँ, कहानियाँ आरंभ से ही देश के प्रसि( पत्रा-पत्रिकाओं में प्रकाशित होती रही हैं। अब उनकी कई रचनाएँ पुस्तकाकार भी हमारे सामने उपस्थित हो गई हैं। यहाँ उन पुस्तकों का संक्षिप्त वर्णन प्रस्तुत किया जा रहा है- 

जीवनछंद-:

जीवनछंद एक काव्य-संकलन है। इसमें कवि के समय-समय पर लिखी गई कविताओं को संग्रह किया गया है। इसमें एक ओर समसामयिक विषयों पर भावाभिव्यक्ति है तो दूसरी ओर कबीर, दिनकर, महादेवी आदि के प्रति श्रद्धांजलि भी। इनकी मातृभूमि का रक्षक, सत्य का प्रयोग, जीवन, जागृति, अर्ध पड़ाव, अहसास है मुझे, कबीर आदि कविताएँ जीवन के असली मर्म को प्रस्तुत करती जान पड़ती हैं। बिहार हिंदी ग्रंथ अकादमी के निदेशक अमर कुमार सिंह ने इस पुस्तक की भूमिका में इन कविताओं टिप्पणी करते हुए लिखा है कि ‘‘कलानाथ ने अपनी कविताओं में रागात्मक संवेदना के बल पर ‘व्यक्तित्व की खोज’ करते हैं, जिसे उपलब्ध् कर व्यक्ति सामाजिक असंगतियों से उत्पन्न संघातों को सहकर भी बिना टूटे हुए अपने दायित्व का अनुभव कर उसे पूर्ण करने की क्षमता को विकसित करने का निश्चय केवल अपने हित के लिए नहीं, वरन् समाज के व्यापक हित के लिए करता है।’’ डॉ. कलानाथ मिश्रजी की कविताएँ रागात्मक संवेदानाओं से पूर्ण होने के बावजूद स्वछंदतावादी ;रोमांटिकद्ध नहीं हैं। इसमें यथार्थ से गहरी संपृक्तता परिलक्षित होती है।
       
हिन्दी उपन्यास में साहित्यकारों का चरित्रा-विधान -:

यह एक आलोचनात्मक पुस्तक है जिसमें साहित्यकारों के जीवनवृत पर लिखे गए हिन्दी उपन्यासों का मूल्यांकन किया गया है। इस मूल्यांकन के लिए आलोचक कलानाथ मिश्र ने कालिदास की आत्मकथा, बाणभट्ट की आत्मकथा, हरादर्पण, लखिमा की आँखें, लोई का ताना, रत्ना की बात, भारती का सपूत, मेरी भव बाध हरो, मानस का हंस, खंजन नयन नामक उपन्यासों  को लिया है। इन उपन्यासों में  से प्रथम तीन संस्कृत रचनाकारों के जीवनवृत पर आधरित हैं शेष हिंदी के रचनाकारों के जीवन पर। इस आलोचनात्मक ग्रंथ में लेखक ने उपन्यासों के ऐतिहासिक परिपे्रक्ष्य एवं औपन्यासिक कल्पना की पड़ताल की है। साथ ही उनमें लेखक की संवेदनाओं की गहराई को भी परखने एवं विश्लेषित करने का प्रयास किया है। इस पुस्तक से हमें डॉ. कलानाथ मिश्र की सूक्ष्म आलोचनात्मक दृष्टि एवं गहन वैचारिकता का प्रमाण मिलता है। यह पुस्तक इसलिए भी उपादेय हो जाती है क्योंकि इसमें साहित्यकारों के जीवन पर लिखे गए सभी उपन्यासों को एक कलेवर में प्रस्तुत कर उनके गुण-दोषों की विवेचना की गई है। साहित्य के अध्येताओं के लिए यह एक उपयोगी पुस्तक है। 

हिंदी उपन्यासों में संस्कृत रचनाकारों का जीवनवृत-:

यह भी एक आलोचनात्मक पुस्तक है जिसमें संस्कृत के कवियों के जीवनवृत पर आधरित हिंदी उपन्यासों की आलोचना प्रस्तुत की गई है। संस्कृत के तीन महाकवियों कालिदास, बाणभट्ट एवं कल्हण पर हिंदी में क्रमशः तीन उपन्यास लिखे गए हैं-कालिदास की आत्मकथा, बाणभट्ट की आत्मकथा एवं हरादर्पण। इन उपन्यासों की चर्चा आलोचक ने उपर्युक्त ग्रंथ में भी की है परंतु ये उपन्यास अपने विषयवस्तु की गहनता के कारण अलग से विस्तृत समीक्षा की अपेक्षा रखते हैं। यही कारण है कि लेखक ने इन उपन्यासों की आलोचना प्रस्तुत पुस्तक में विस्तार से की है। इसमें आलोचक ने इन उपन्यासों की कथा की प्रामाणिता एवं उनके स्रोतों पर विचार करते हुए संस्कृत के इन कवियों एवं उपन्यास में वर्णित उनके जीवन के बीच के अंतर को स्पष्ट करने का प्रयास किया है। इनमें आलोचक ने उपन्यासों के रचना-विधन एवं उनकी भाषा पर भी अपना विचार व्यक्त किया है। इन तीनों उपन्यासों के प्रति उत्सुकता उत्पन्न करने एवं उन्हें ठीक से समझने में यह पुस्तक उपयोगी सि( हो सकती है। 

दो कमरे का मन-:

‘दो कमरे का मन’ एक कहानी संग्रह है। इसमें ग्यारह कहानियों को संकलित किया गया है। इन कहानियों में लेखक ने रोजमर्रा के जीवन में गुजरने वाली विभिन्न घटनाओं को अपनी संवेदनापूर्ण दृष्टि से देखने का प्रयास किया है। इन कहानियों में यद्यपि अलग-अलग घटनाक्रम को दर्शाया गया है किंतु संवेदना के स्तर पर सभी कहानियों में आंतरिक अभिन्नता दृष्टिगोचर होती है। सभी कहानियों में परिवारिक, सामाजिक और संस्कृतिक मूल्यों में हो रहे विघटन पर चिंता व्यक्त की गई है। संवेदनात्मक स्तर की यह अभिन्नता कहानी संग्रह को सार्थक भी बनाती है क्यांेकि यह संग्रह एक ही मूड की कहानियों को एक साथ परोसने का उपक्रम करता है। इन कहानियों में पाठकों को मूल्यहीनता के कई स्तर और रंग देखने को मिल जाते हैं। यह मूल्यहीनता आज मित्रा को मित्रा से अलग, पिता को पुत्रा से अलग करने और सारी आत्मीयता को औपचारिकता में बदलने पर तुली हुई है। 
‘दो कमरे का मन’ इस संग्रह की पहली कहानी है तथा उसी के नाम पर पुस्तक का नाम भी रखा गया है। इस कहानी में लेखक ने यह दर्शाने का प्रयास किया है कि शहरों में आज लोग छोटे से दायरे में रहने को विवश ही नहीं हैं, उनके मन का दायरा भी संकुचित होता जा रहा है। उनका घर ही छोटा नहीं होता उनका मन भी छोटा होता जा रहा है। इस कहानी में हम देखते हैं कि सुदीप के बचपन के मित्रा तापस के लिए न तो उसके घर में जगह रहती है न ही उसके दिल में। शहरी संस्कृति किस प्रकार लोगों की आत्मीयता और अपनेपन को क्षीण करती जा रही है-इस कहानी में हम बखूबी देख सकते हैं। 
इस संग्रह की दूसरी कहानी है-मोक्ष। इसमें आधुनिकता के चकाचैंध् में अंधा  हुए एक बेटे की कहानी कही गई है जो अपने माता-पिता तक को धेखा देने में नहीं झेंपता। इस कहानी में बंटी अपनी माता की अंत्येष्टि तक में नहीं उपस्थित होता। वह अपने बूढे़ पिता को बुढ़ापे में सब्जबाग दिखाकर सारी पैतृक संपत्ति बेच देता है तथा उन्हें लंदन ले जाने के बहाने हवाई अड्डे पर छोड़कर चला जाता है। इस कहानी में एक ओर बेटे की मूल्यहीनता है तो दूसरी ओर एक असहाय एवं एकाकी पिता की बेवस तड़प।
‘तेजाब’ कहानी में हम एक नौकर की अपने मालिक के प्रति अटूट श्रद्धा की हत्या होते देखते हैं। बनारसी को अपने डिप्टी साहब पर अटूट विश्वास था, लेकिन डिप्टी साहब ने उसके विश्वास का अनुचित पफायदा उठाया और उसे कर्ज में डुबो दिया। 
‘आम के पेड़’ में कहानीकार ने आम के पेड़ के माध्यम से यह बताने का प्रयास किया है कि आज की उपभोक्तावादी संस्कृति में पेड़ और घर के बुजुर्ग किस प्रकार अप्रासंगिक होते जा रहे हैं। दोनों पिछडेपन और अन-आध्ुनिकता के पर्याय बन गये हैं। ऐसे में घर के आहाते से पेड़ ही नहीं काटे जा रहे, बल्कि बूढ़े-बुजुर्गों की गरिमा और अहमियता भी तिल-तिल कर काटी जा रही है। 
‘डाॅलरपुत्रा’ में मोक्ष कहानी की संवेदना को ही दूसरे संदर्भ में प्रस्तुत किया गया है। बेटे के विदेश में डाॅलर कमाने से पड़ोसियों के बीच माता-पिता की धक तो जमती है, परंतु पुत्रा के डालर मोह के सामने वे अपने आपको एकदम उपेक्षित महसूस करते हैं। डाॅलर का मोह पारिवारिक आत्मीयता को महज औपचारिता में बदल देता है। माता-पिता द्वारा उनके साथ रहने की बात बेटे को इमोशनल ब्लैकमेलिंग लगती है। 
‘निर्मम’ कहानी में भी रिश्तों की टुटन को विषय बनाया गया है। इसमें राजलक्ष्मी के माध्यम से कहानीकार ने यह बताने का प्रयास किया है कि किस प्रकार माँ के मर जाने और पिता के दूसरी शादी कर लेने पर राजलक्ष्मी को बेसहारा एक चर्च के हवाले कर दिया जाता है और वह एकाकी जीवन जीने को मजबूर हो जाती है। उसे मातृ एवं पितृ प्रेम के अभाव की पीड़ा हमेशा उद्वेलित करती रहती है। 
‘ज्वार-भाटा’ अपने जीवन की विषम परिस्थितियों से लड़ते हुए आगे बढ़ने वाली तनु नामक महिला की कहानी है। तनु का विवाह होता है वह सोचती है कि विवाह के बाद उसका जीवन सुखमय हो जाएगा परंतु उसके पति की मृत्यु बे्रन ट्यूमर से हो जाती है। वह वैध्व्य जीवन जीते हुए अपने एक मात्रा बच्चे के जीवन को सँवारने के लिए अपने पैरों पर खड़ी होने का प्रयास करती है।
‘पार्क’ कहानी में वृद्धों के एकाकी जीवन एवं घर में हो रही उनकी उपेक्षा को विषय बनाया गया है। सोमेश्वरजी सुबह पार्क में टहलने जाते हैं। वहाँ उन्हें जगदीश बाबू से आत्मीयता हो जाती है। जगदीश बाबू, जो अपनी पीड़ा को अपने अंदर ही छुपाये रहते थे, इनके सामने अपने आपको खोलकर रख देते हैं। उनकी पीड़ा आधुनिक  समाज और परिवार के सभी वृद्धों की सम्मिलित पीड़ा है। वैसे तो जगदीश बाबू को किसी प्रकार की कमी नहीं है। उनके दोनों बेटे आई.ए.एस. हैं परंतु घर में न किसी को उनसे आत्मीयता है न ही उनसे बात करने की किसी को पफुरसत। 
‘शिकायत’ नामक कहानी एक महत्वाकांक्षी युवक की कहानी है जो जीवन में सब कुछ प्राप्त कर लेना चाहता है। अचानक एक दिन उसका एक्सीडेंट एक अभावग्रस्त व्यक्ति के साथ हो जाता है और उसे पता चलता है कि जीवन केवल पाने का नाम नहीं है। किसी की सहायता करना भी असीम संतुष्टि प्रदान करता है। 
‘अतिथि’ कहानी में लेखक ने अद्यतन परिवेश में बदल रही परंपराओं और नैतिक मूल्यों के ह्रास को रेखांकित करने का प्रयास किया है। भारत की संस्कृति अतिथि को देवता मानते रहने की रही है, लेकिन आज अतिथि और अंजान व्यक्तियों का स्वागत तो दूर, अपने रिश्ते-नाते तक को लोग बोझ समझने लगे हैं। आज लोगों के मन में ‘अतिथि देवो’ नहीं, ‘दैत्यों भवः’ की भावना व्याप्त होती जा रही है। 
‘सृष्टिचक्र’ कहानी में लेखक ने डिंक अर्थात् डबल इनकम नो चाइल्ड की संस्कृति पर कटाक्ष किया है। आज माता-पिता दोनों काम करते हैं। ऐसे में अव्वल तो वे संतान की कामना ही नहीं करते और यदि करते भी है तो संतान के साथ समय न देकर उन्हें दाइयों के सहारे छोड़ देते हैं। यही कारण है कि बच्चों में भी माता-पिता के प्रति कोई श्रद्धा भाव नहीं है। 
इसप्रकार हम समग्ररूप से देखें तो सारी कहानियों में मानवीय मूल्यों के उत्तरोत्तर ”ास को ही दिखाने का प्रयास परिलक्षित होता है। 
सुप्रसि (कथालेखिका चित्रा मुद्गल) ने इन कहानियों पर टिप्पणी करते हुए लिखा है-‘‘कलानाथ मिश्र का सजग कथाकार अपनी समाज सापेक्ष दृष्टि से उन आहटों को निरंतर टोह और सुन रहा है जिसे सुना और गुणा जाना समय रहते बहुत जरूरी है। उसी की अनिवार्यता से जनमती है-‘दो कमरे का मन’ जैसी अद्भुत कथा-रचना।.......बाजारवाद के अंधे अँधेरों  की उपभोक्तावादी मानसिकता की काली परछाइयाँ ‘मोक्ष’, ‘डालरपुत्र’, ‘तेजाब’, पार्क जैसी उनकी अन्य बांधे रखने वाली गझिन गथा-रचनाओं के मर्म में सघनता से प्रतिबिम्बित हुई हैं। जीवन मूल्यों की वापसी के लिए संघर्षरत उनकी यह सार्थक कथा-यात्रा निश्चय ही ताजे हवा के झोंके-सी आश्वस्तकारी है।’’ 

   प्रख्यात साहित्यकार डॉ.रामदरश मिश्र ने प्रस्तुत कथा-संग्रह पर अपनी प्रतिक्रिया देते हुए कहा है-"इनमें आज के समय का यथार्थ तो है ही उसे सलीके से कहा भी गया है। इसमें परिवेश और मन की एक दूसरे में प्रभावशाली ढंग से आवा-जाही हुई है। विचार और संवेदना की सम्यक् सहयात्रा हुई है। कहानीकार ने आज की उपभोक्तावादी और बाजारवादी विसंगतियों का पुरअसर उद्घाटन किया है तथा उनके द्वारा निर्मित नये मूल्यों की निस्सारता को व्यंजित करते हुए उन पुराने देशी मूल्यों के प्रति आस्था संकेतित की है जो आज भी प्रासंगिक है, मानवीय हैं। अच्छी बात यह है कि कथाकार ने अपनी ओर से कुछ नहीं कहा है सब कुछ कहानी को कहने दिया है और पाठक पर छोड़ दिया है कि वह अभिप्रेत अर्थ के साथ हो लें। मनुष्यता की पहचान करने वाला ‘विजन’ आद्यंत व्याप्त हैं।"

वे कलानाथ मिश्र की कहानियों की रचना धर्मिता की भूरि -भूरि प्रशंसा करते हुए कहते हैं-"क्या भाषा, क्या कथन शैली, क्या कहानीपन सभी दृष्टियों से ये कहानियाँ मुझे प्रभावित कर गई।" कुल मिलाकर यह प्रस्तुत कथा संग्रह महानगरीय संत्रास और संघर्ष को उकेरती हैं। कहानी का पफलक विस्तृत है। ये कहानियाँ पाठक को प्रभावित किए बिना नहीं रह सकतीं।

याद रखना इस पथिक को-:

‘याद रखना इस पथिक को’ मिथिला के सामान्य परिवार में जन्मी तथा अनंत संघर्षों के बाद एक सपफल चिकित्सक के रूप में अप्रतिम ख्याति अर्जित करनेवाली महिला श्रीमती जगदीश्वरी मिश्र की जीवनी है। श्रीमती मिश्र के जीवनवृत को डा. कलानाथ मिश्र ने बड़ी संवेदना एवं कलात्मकता के साथ एक जीवनी का रूप तथा कथात्मक तारतम्य प्रदान किया है। इस पुस्तक में जगदीश्वरी मिश्र के जन्म, शिक्षा-दीक्षा, डाक्टरी पढ़ने एवं प्रैक्टिस करने, पारिवारिक दायित्वों के निर्वाह, जीवन के उतार-चढ़ाव आदि का बड़ी सूक्ष्मता एवं मार्मिकता के साथ वर्णन किया गया है। इसमें श्रीमती मिश्र के जीवन की उपलब्ध्यिों के साथ-साथ जीवन के उत्तरार्द्ध में उनकी वैध्व्य की पीड़ा को भी उकेरने का प्रयास किया गया है। इस पुस्तक में श्रीमती मिश्र के जीवन के विभिन्न अवसरों एवं गतिविध्यिों से जुड़ी तस्वीरों को भी प्रस्तुत किया गया है। कुल मिलाकर यह जीवनी एक सामान्य घर में जन्मी नारी के संघर्ष की कहानी है जो सभी महिलाओं के लिए प्रेरणास्रोत है। इसे पढ़कर निश्चय ही महिलाओं को, खासकर सामान्य महिलाओं को आगे बढ़ने एवं जीवन की विसंगतियों से लड़ने की प्रेरणा मिलेगी।
    
आवारा मसीहा की औपन्यासिकता-:,

    यह एक आलोचनात्मक ग्रंथ है जिसमें विष्णु प्रभाकर द्वारा रचित शरत्चंद्र की जीवनी ‘आवारा मसीहा’ की समीक्षा प्रस्तुत की गई है। इस ग्रंथ की आलोचना के क्रम में डॉ. कलानाथ मिश्र ने जीवनी और उपन्यास के बीच के अंतर को स्पष्ट करते हुए आवारा मसीहा में जीवनी एवं औपन्यासिक तत्व का अन्वेषण किया है। उन्होंने जीवनी की प्रामाणिकता और अप्रामाणिकता की खोज करते हुए उसके उन स्रोतों की वैधता  एवं अवैधता पर भी अपना विचार व्यक्त किया है जिनसे इस जीवनी का तानाबाना बुना गया है। आलोचना के क्रम में आलोचक ने जीवनी के विविध् मार्मिक प्रसंगों का उ(रण भी प्रस्तुत किया है जो मूल पुस्तक पढ़ने के लिए प्रेरित तो करता ही है साथ ही उन प्रसंगों के मर्म को समझाने में भी सहायक सिद्ध होता है। 

साहित्यः विविध परिप्रेक्ष्य -:

इसमें कलानाथ मिश्र के विभिन्न विषयों पर लिखे गए लेखों तथा दिए गए व्याख्यानों का संकलन किया गया है। इस संग्रह में हिंदी साहित्य के कुछ प्रसि( रचनाकारों पर विचार व्यक्त करने वाले आलेख हैं। जैसे-‘यात्राी-नागार्जुन की कविता में प्रतिरोध् चेतना’, ‘जीवन-मर्म को चित्रित करनेवाले कालजयी साहित्यकार: विष्णु प्रभाकर’, ‘राजा साहब का कथा संसार’, ‘मगध् प्रक्षेत्रा के यशस्वी साहित्यकार: एक विहंगावलोकन’। इन निबंधें के अतिरिक्त हिंदी पत्राकारिता से संबंध्ति लेख है- ‘बिहार की हिन्दी पत्राकारिता: एक संघर्षशील चेतना का इतिहास’। भाषा, संस्कृति एवं साहित्य के विचार से जुडे निबंध् हैं-‘समकालीन हिन्दी कथा साहित्य में भारतीयता’, ‘भारतीय संस्कृति में पर्यावरण चेतना और आध्ुनिक विकास’, ‘समाज, साहित्य और ध्र्म’। वर्तमान समाज में स्त्राी की स्थिति और स्त्राी विमर्श के मर्म को उद्घाटित करने वाला निबंध् है-‘स्त्री विमर्श : स्त्रिायोचित मनोभावों से संपृक्त सामाजिक मूल्य का विमर्श’। हिंदी के स्वरूप और उसके विकास को रेखांकित करने वाले निबंध् हैं- ‘भाषा का स्वरूप एवं हिन्दी की जादुई शक्ति’, ‘हिन्दी के वैश्विक स्वरूप का निर्माण करती वेब पत्रिकाएँ’। इस प्रकार यह संग्रह अलग-अलग विषयों पर लेखक के अभिव्यक्त विचारों का गुलदस्ता है। 

साहित्य यात्रा--:

साहित्य यात्रा डॉ. कलानाथ मिश्र के संपादन में प्रकाशित होने वाली एक त्रौमासिक साहित्यिक पत्रिका है। इसका प्रकाशन बिहार की राजधनी पटना से हो रहा है। इसका पहला अंक अप्रैल-जून 1914 में प्रकाशित हुआ था। इस पत्रिका के अभी तक चार अंक निकल चुके हैं जिनमें से दो अंक क्रमशः आचार्य विश्वनाथ प्रसाद तिवारी एवं श्री नरेंद्र कोहली के व्यक्तित्व एवं कृतित्व पर केंद्रित हैं। यह पत्रिका आरंभ से ही शोध्परक एवं उत्कृष्ट साहित्यिक आलेखों को प्रकाशित करता आ रहा है। इसमें आधुनिक  काल में सक्रिय हिंदी के नामचीन साहित्यकारों की रचनाएँ तो प्रकाशित होती ही हैं, नये रचनाकारों की रचनाओं को भी इसमें छपने का अवसर प्रदान किया जाता है। अब तक इसके जितने भी अंक निकले हैं अपनी विशिष्ट रचनाओं के कारण पठनीय और संग्रहनीय बन गए हैं। 
इन पुस्तकों और पत्रिकाओं के अतिरिक्त डॉ. कलानाथ मिश्र की रचनाएँ कई अन्य पुस्तकों में भी  अलग-अलग साहित्यकारों के साथ प्रकाशित हुई हैं जिसमें ‘बारह सते चैरासी’ महत्वपूर्ण है। इसमें डॉ. कलानाथ मिश्र की सात कविताओं के साथ हिंदी के अन्य बारह समकालीन कवियों की सात-सात कविताएँ संकलित की गई हैं। मिश्रजी ने कई पुस्तकों का संपादन भी किया है। बिहार के गौरव सच्चिदानंद सिन्हा द्वारा लिखित पुस्तक ‘सम इमिनेंट बिहार कंटेंपोररीज’ का हिंदी अनुवाद भी इन्होंने किया है। इनकी कई व्यंग्य रचनाएँ भी प्रकाशित हुई हैं जिसमें ‘गांधी टोपी का पेटेंट’, ‘साहित्यकार बनाने की एजेंसी’, ‘अथ हिंदी पूजन’ आदि महत्वपूर्ण हैं। 

डा. मिश्र विभिन्न सरकारी गैर सरकारी संस्थाओं से संबद्ध रहे हैं जिनमें भारत के राष्ट्रपति द्वारा उद्घाटित प्रथम बिहार राज्य अन्तर विष्वविद्यालय सांस्कृतिक महोत्सव ‘तरंग’ -2008 के कोर कमिटी के सदस्य रहे। पूर्व सदस्य, कार्यकारिणी समिति, बिहार राज्य बाल कल्याण परिषद्, राजभवन, पटना। सदस्य, मैथिली अकादमी, बिहार सरकार आजीवन सदस्य, बिहार हिन्दी साहिन्य सम्मेलन, पटना । सदस्य कार्यकारिणी समिति, राष्ट्रीय मानवाधिकार संरक्षण प्रतिष्ठान। सांस्कृतिक सचिव, सेन्टर फॉर  रीडरषिप डेवलपमेन्ट, आयोजक पटना पुस्तक मेला। पूर्व संयुक्त सचिव एवं सदस्य कार्यकारिणी समिति, चेतना समिति, पटनाअघ्यक्ष, सृजन संगति, उपाध्यक्ष: समय संवाद (साहित्यिक संस्था) आदि का नाम लिया जा सकता है। सम्प्रति मगध विश्वविद्यालय में विश्वविद्यालय प्राचार्य के रूप में ए.एन. कॉलेज,पटना में कार्यरत हैं।

Publications
Hindi Upanyas me Sahityakaron ka charitra vidhan
Hindi Upanyas me Sanskrit rachanakaron ka Jivan vrit
Jivan Chhand (kavita Sangrah)
Aawara Masiha: Ek Oupanyasik Jivani
Mera Jivan Swet Shyam (kavita Sangrah)
Do Kamare Ka Man (Kahani Sankalan)

Translations
Some Eminent Behar Contemporaries by Dr. Sachidanand Sinha.

Certificates of honour
Visisht Rachnakar Samman By ‘NAI DHARA’ Founded by eminent litterateur Raja Radhika Raman Pd. Singh, Suryapura House, Boring Road, Patna- 800 001
Acharya Ramchandra Shukla Samman, By Sahityakar Sansad, Bihar.

References 

Hindi-language writers
1959 births
Living people
Academic staff of Magadh University
Patna University alumni
Writers from Patna